Washington Mills is an unincorporated community in Greene County, in the U.S. state of Ohio.

History
The namesake Washington Mills consisted of a sawmill and gristmill built on the site at the Little Miami River in the 1830s.

References

Unincorporated communities in Greene County, Ohio
1830s establishments in Ohio
Unincorporated communities in Ohio